Swimming at the 2019 Games of the Small States of Europe was held from 28 to 30 May 2019 at the Morača Sports Center, Podgorica.

Medal table

Medalists

Men

Women

References

External links
Results

2019 Games of the Small States of Europe
2019 in swimming
2019
Swimming in Montenegro
Sports competitions in Podgorica